Twisted is a 1996 film written and directed by Seth Michael Donsky in his debut. The film, a Don Quixote and Miravista Films production, is a retelling of Charles Dickens' classic 1838 novel Oliver Twist, set in a New York City contemporary underground populated by drag queens, drug abusers and hustlers. The film was an official selection and debuted in 1997 at the 47th Berlin International Film Festival, and was also screened as an official selection at the Seattle International Film Festival. Donsky's film was made prior to Jacob Tierney's similar film Twist, starring American actor Nick Stahl.

Donsky's Twisted was re-discovered by the Museum of Modern Art in 2013, included in their Charles Dickens bicentenary film series and subsequently accepted into their permanent film collection.

Synopsis
William Hickey stars as Andre, a lecherous brothel owner who trades in young men. Exploiting his young charges through paternalism and drugs, Andre sets his sights on Lee (Keivyn McNeil Graves), a ten-year-old, black, runaway orphan. Through Andre, Lee quickly becomes immersed in New York's sleazy underbelly of a drug dealer (Anthony Crivello stars as "Eddie") and street hustlers. The boy's only hope for survival is the aspiring songwriter Angel (David Norona), himself a former hustler. Angel befriends Lee and rescues him from the wiles of Andre's cohort Fine Art (Jean Loup Wolfman), who attempts to profit on Lee's tender age. Eventually, Andre's petty empire is vanquished by Shiniqua (Billy Porter), a powerfully wise and glamorous drag queen whose fiercely maternal spirit is every bit the match for the depraved denizens of the brothel.

Cast 
 William Hickey as Andre, brothel owner
 Anthony Crivello as Eddie, drug dealer
 David Noroña as Angel, Eddie's boyfriend
 Keivyn McNeill Graves as Lee, black runaway orphan
 Billy Porter as Shiniqua, drag queen and Angel's friend
 Jean Loup Wolfman as Arthur 'Fine Art', a hustler
 Ray Aranha as Black Can Man
 Elizabeth Franz as Mrs. Bundrass, social Worker
 Simon Brook as Undercover Cop
 Erik Jensen as Punk
 Brenda Pressley as Mrs. Burns, Lee's foster mother
 Eugene Byrd as Willus, Mrs. Burns' son
 Keisha Howard as Laylene, Willus Burn's girlfriend
 Lynn Tanner as Celine Holland, a district attorney
 Kelly Coyle as Arthur's Girlfriend
 Rose Baum Senerchia as Andre's Mother
 Angelo Berkowitz as Brothel Boy
 Giovanni Giaconi as Taxi driver
 Ross Haines as Arresting Officer

Awards and recognition

Twisted was an official selection at the 47th Berlin International Film Festival and the Seattle International Film Festival. The Museum of Modern Art (MoMA) New York screened Twisted in its Cineprobe Series in 1997 and granted the director an honorarium for his work.  MoMA screened the film again in 2013 as part of the Museum's celebration of the Charles Dickens' bicentenary film series and inducted the film into their permanent film collection.

The film won the Audience Prize at the 12th Turin LGBT Film Festival (The Lovers Film Festival, formerly Da Sodoma a Hollywood Torino GLBT Film Festival) and Best First Feature at the Ottawa LGBT Inside Out Film and Video Festival.

References

External links 
 
 
 Twisteds official page at the Berlin Film Festival
  Trailer

1996 films
1996 directorial debut films
American drama films
American LGBT-related films
1996 LGBT-related films
Films based on Oliver Twist
1990s English-language films
1990s American films